St. Mark's Church, or variations such as St. Mark Church or with Saint spelled out, may mean:

Australia 
 St Mark's Anglican Church, Warwick, Queensland
 St Mark's Church, Darling Point, New South Wales
 Old St Mark's Anglican Church, Slacks Creek, a heritage-listed church in Queensland

Canada 
 St. Mark's Church, an Anglican church in Niagara-on-the-Lake, Ontario

Croatia 
 St. Mark's Church, Zagreb

Denmark 
 St. Mark's Church, Aarhus
 St. Mark's Church, Copenhagen

France 
 St. Mark's Church, Versailles

India 
 St. Mark's Church, Chennai

Ireland 
 St. Mark's Church, Dublin

Italy 
 St Mark's English Church, Florence

Malta 
 St Mark's Church, Rabat

Norway 
 St. Mark's Church, Bergen
 St. Mark's Church, Oslo

Serbia 
 St. Mark's Church, Belgrade
 St. Mark's Church, Užice

Slovenia 
 St. Mark's Church, Vrba

Sri Lanka 
 St. Mark's Church, Badulla

Ukraine 
 St. Mark's Church, Variazh

United Kingdom

England

London 
 St Mark's Church, Kennington
 St Mark's Church, Myddelton Square, Clerkenwell
 St Mark's Regents Park
 St Mark's Church, Silvertown (Victoria Docks), now deconsecrated
 St Mark's Church, Surbiton
 St Mark's Church, Hamilton Terrace, St John's Wood

Elsewhere in England 
 St Mark's Church, Ampfield, Hampshire
 St Mark's Church, Antrobus, Cheshire
 St Mark's Church, Basford, Staffordshire
 St Mark's Church, Blackburn, Lancashire
 St Mark's Church, Brighton, East Sussex
 St Mark's Church, Bristol, a Grade I listed building
St Mark's Church, Bournemouth, a Grade II listed building
 Church of St Mark, Broomhill, Sheffield
 St Mark's Church, Dolphinholme, Lancashire
 St Mark's Church, Gillingham, Kent, designed by James Piers St Aubyn
 St Mark's Church, Hadlow Down, East Sussex
 St Mark's Church, Horsham, West Sussex
 St Mark's Church, Mansfield, Nottinghamshire
 St Mark's Church, Natland, Cumbria
 St Mark's Church, Preston, Lancashire
 St Mark's Church, Royal Tunbridge Wells, Kent
 St Mark's Church, Saltney, Cheshire
 St Mark's Church, Scarisbrick, Lancashire
 St Mark's Church, Swindon, Wiltshire
 St. Mark's Church, Woolston, Southampton
 St Mark's Church, Wootton, Isle of Wight

Isle of Man 
St Mark's Church, St Mark's, Malew, Isle of Man, one of Isle of Man's Registered Buildings

Northern Ireland 
 St Mark's Church, Dundela, Belfast

Wales 
 St Mark's Church, Brithdir, Gwynedd, a grade I listed building
 St Mark's Church, Connah's Quay, Flintshire
 St Mark's Church, Newport

United States

Colorado
St. Mark's Church (Denver, Colorado), a Denver Landmark

Connecticut 
 St. Mark Church (Stratford, Connecticut)

Delaware 
 St. Mark's Church, Millsboro, Sussex County, Delaware

New Jersey 
 St. Mark Coptic Orthodox Church (Jersey City, New Jersey), also known as Saint Mark Church

New York 
 St. Mark's Church (Clark Mills, New York), NRHP-listed
 German Evangelical Lutheran Church of St. Mark, New York City
 St. Mark the Evangelist Church (New York City)
 St. Mark's Church in-the-Bowery, New York City
 St. Mark's Church (Port Leyden, New York), NRHP-listed

Ohio 
 Saint Mark's Lutheran School and Church (Milford, Ohio), LCMS establishment

South Carolina 
 St. Mark's Episcopal Church (Pinewood, South Carolina), NRHP-listed

Washington D.C. 
 St. Mark's Episcopal Church (Washington, D.C.), NRHP-listed

See also 
 St. Mark's (disambiguation)
 Saint Mark's Cathedral (disambiguation)
 Saint Mark's Coptic Orthodox Church (disambiguation)
 St. Mark's Episcopal Church (disambiguation)
 St. Mark's Episcopal Cathedral (disambiguation)
 St. Mark's Lutheran Church (disambiguation)
 St Mark's Basilica
 Crkva Svetog Marka (disambiguation)